Kelsey Asbille Chow (born September 9, 1991) is an American actress. She is known for her role as Mikayla in the Disney XD sitcom Pair of Kings, and as Monica Long in the TV Series Yellowstone. From 2005 to 2009, she had a recurring role as Gigi Silveri on the drama One Tree Hill. She portrayed Tracy Stewart in MTV's Teen Wolf from 2015–2016.

For all of her screen credits up through 2017, she is listed as Kelsey Chow. For most of her roles since that year, such as for  Wind River, Yellowstone, and Fargo, she is credited as Kelsey Asbille.

Early life
Kelsey Asbille Chow's parents are Dr. James Chow and Jean Chow. She has two younger siblings: a brother, Forrest, and a sister, Kiersten. Chow has said her father is Chinese. She stated in 2010 that because her father is Chinese, she wanted to be more fluent in Mandarin Chinese, as well as read traditional Chinese characters. 

In 2017 and 2018, when she was cast in Native American roles, she stated in multiple interviews she was "part Cherokee" and that she had "Native heritage". She told The New York Times that she was of "Eastern Band Cherokee descent" and that playing an Indigenous woman was "in [her] blood." This resulted in the tribe issuing a statement that they have no record of Chow, nor did they find any evidence that she is a descendant. 

Chow attended Hammond School for high school, located in Columbia, SC. She is based in Los Angeles, but also lives part-time in New York City where she attended Columbia University as a Human Rights major.

Career
After gaining experience in community theatre, Chow got her first television role in 2005 where she played the recurring role of Gigi Silveri on One Tree Hill at the age of 13 appearing on the show until 2009.

In 2008, she guest starred on The Suite Life of Zack & Cody. She also co-starred in the Disney Channel original film Den Brother.

From 2010 to 2013, Chow co-starred as Mikayla on Disney XD original series Pair of Kings.

In 2012, Chow had a small part in The Amazing Spider-Man, and was later cast in the feature film Run.

In 2014, she was cast in the Fox drama Hieroglyph. However, the series was cancelled before it premiered.

She co-starred in 2015 with Stefanie Scott in the music video for Hayley Kiyoko's song "Girls Like Girls", and appeared in the recurring role of Tracy Stewart on season five of Teen Wolf (the first ten episodes premiered on June 29, 2015, while the second half premiered on January 5, 2016).

For all of her screen credits up through 2017, she is listed as Kelsey Chow. For most of her roles since that year, such as for Wind River, Yellowstone, and Fargo (when she has portrayed Native American women) she is credited as Kelsey Asbille.

Personal life 
Asbille dated English actor William Moseley from 2012 to 2018.

Filmography
For all of her roles, unless otherwise indicated, she is credited as Kelsey Chow.

Film

Television

Music videos

References

External links

1991 births
Living people
21st-century American actresses
American child actresses
American film actresses
American actresses of Chinese descent
American people who self-identify as being of Native American descent
American stage actresses
American television actresses
Columbia College (New York) alumni
Actresses from Columbia, South Carolina